The Prince Edward Island Junior C Hockey League is a Junior "C" ice hockey league in Prince Edward Island, Canada, sanctioned by Hockey Canada. The league was known as the Prince Edward Island Minor Junior Hockey League until 2009.

The winner of the playoffs competes in the Maritime-Hockey North Junior C Championship.

History 
In 2015 the South Side Lynx won their first league championship and then proceeded to be the first PEI representative to advance to the Maritime-Hockey North Junior C Championship final game. In the championship game the Lynx played against the Baffin Blizzard with both teams vying to be the first team from their province/territory to claim a Maritime-Hockey North title. The Baffin Blizzard prevailed, winning 6–5.

After a one-year absence a Summerside team, now known as the Crunch, was announced as returning to the league for the 2016–17 season.

Sherwood Metros became the first PEI team to win the Maritime-Hockey North Championship in 2018. The Metros defeated South Side Lynx 4–1 in the final.

In January 2019 the South Side Lynx ceased operations due to a lack of healthy players. The team posted a 5–13–0–2 record, last in the five-team league. The team announced a return for 2020–21.

Teams

Former teams (1997–present)

 Bedeque Red Wings (1998–99)
 Belfast Sabres (2001–17)
 Charlottetown Abbies (1997–2005; 2009–12)
 Evangeline Loggers (2005–07)
 Georgetown Eagles (2017–18)
 Georgetown Timberwolves (1997–98)
 Holland College Hurricanes (2010–12)
 Montague Norsemen (1998–2001; 2003–04)
 Montague Sharks (2010–11)
 Morell Crunch (2010–13)
 Morell Flyers (2003–10; 2015–16)
 Morell Mustangs (1997–2002)
 North River Flames (1997–98) - returned to league in 2005
 Pownal Nicks (1997–98)
 Pownal Red Devils (2003–12)
 Rustico Whitecaps (1999–2005)
 Sherwood Falcons (1997–98; 1999–2009; 2013–15) 
 Souris Boat Haulers (2008–09)
 Souris Hawks (1999–2000; 2013–15)
 South Side Lynx (2001–2019) - returned to league in 2020
 Summerside Capitals (2003–05; 2013–14)
 Summerside Crunch (2016–20)
 Tignish Aces (1997–98; 2000–01) - returned to league in 2002
 Tyne Valley Clover Farmers (2001–06; 2011–13)

Champions

See also
List of ice hockey teams in Prince Edward Island
Island Junior Hockey League

References

External links
PEI Junior C League

Ice hockey leagues in Prince Edward Island
C